Jason Carl Young (born 17 February 1971) is a former Australian cricketer. He was a right-handed batsman. He played 2 first-class cricket matches for New South Wales between 1994 and 1995, scoring 64 runs.

See also
 List of New South Wales representative cricketers

References

External links
 
 

1971 births
Australian cricketers
New South Wales cricketers
Sportsmen from New South Wales
Living people